Charaxes defulvata is a butterfly in the family Nymphalidae. It is found on the island of São Tomé. The habitat consists of forests. The species of butterfly was named by James John Joicey and George Talbot in 1926.

Taxonomy
The species is often treated as a subspecies of Charaxes varanes following Van Someren, 1974. In 1983 it was given full species status again by Plantrou  
It is considered a member of the Charaxes varanes group.

References

External links
African Butterfly Database Range map via search

Butterflies described in 1926
defulvata
Butterflies of Africa
Endemic fauna of São Tomé Island
Taxa named by James John Joicey
Taxa named by George Talbot (entomologist)